Matti Kalevi Väisänen (born 24 February 1934, Juva) is a former priest of Evangelical Lutheran Church of Finland and the bishop of independent Luther Foundation ordained by Swedish-based Missionsprovinsen, an ecclesiastical province that opposes ordination of women. He graduated doctor of theology from University of Helsinki in 2007. In 2013 Väisänen ordained Risto Soramies as the first bishop of the Evangelical Lutheran Mission Diocese of Finland.

Sources
Luther Foundation bishop and ministers could be removed from established church
Lutheran Church removes renegade bishop

External links
Homepage 

1934 births
Finnish bishops
Living people
People from Juva